Zoo is a station on Line 2 of Chongqing Rail Transit in Chongqing Municipality, China.

The station is located in Jiulongpo District. It opened in 2005.

Station structure

See also
 Chongqing Zoo

References

Jiulongpo District
Railway stations in China opened in 2004
Chongqing Rail Transit stations